Islamic Revival in British India: Deoband, 1860-1900 a research book by Barbara D. Metcalf, Professor of University of California. The book was published in 1982 by Princeton University Press. The main theme of the book is the Deoband movement and the first 40 years of Darul Uloom Deoband which originated in Deoband , a small village in Saharanpur, district of Uttar Pradesh, India.

Content 
The type of Islamic renaissance is described at the beginning of the book. Then the changes of the scholars in the eighteenth and nineteenth centuries are explained. The next chapter is entitled Deoband Movement and School. The first topic of discussion in this chapter is Darul Uloom Deoband. The next topic to be discussed is the religious leadership created by Darul Uloom Deoband. The author discusses this religious leadership in two parts: the Muftis and the Sheikhs, and the Writers and the Debaters. The last topic of this chapter is the social milieu of Deobandi scholars. In the last chapter the author concludes the book by discussing some other contemporary movements of Deoband movement.

See also 
Revival from Below: The Deoband Movement and Global Islam
The Deoband School And The Demand For Pakistan

References

External links 

1982 non-fiction books
American books
Deobandi literature
1982 books
English-language books
History of Islam
Works about Darul Uloom Deoband
Princeton University Press books